The Official Opposition Shadow Cabinet in Canada was formed after the 2020 Conservative Party of Canada leadership election. Erin O'Toole appointed a Shadow Cabinet in September 2020.

By Member
101 MPs have served in the Official Opposition Cabinet at one point in the 43rd Parliament. 42 MPs are currently Senior Shadow Ministers shadowing a specific Minister with portfolio in the House of Commons. In addition there are 8 other Shadow Ministers with specific roles without a ministerial equivalent. Highlight indicates that a Member is a current Senior Shadow Minister. Of the senior members of Shadow Cabinet, 32 are men and 10 are women. 6 are visible minorities (14.3%). Under Andrew Scheer, most senior Shadow Ministers also had a deputy critic for their file. This has been discontinued under his successor, Erin O'Toole. Shadow ministers are often referred to as "critics".

By Shadow Cabinet 
Following the 2019 federal election, held on October 21, 2019, the Conservative Party gained seats, but remained as the Official Opposition, while the governing Liberals formed a minority government. It is led by Erin O'Toole, who was elected as party leader on August 24, 2020. Prior to that, it was led by Andrew Scheer, who was elected as party leader in May 2017.

Erin O'Toole

O'Toole II (February 10, 2021 – February 2, 2022)

O'Toole I (September 2, 2020 – February 9, 2021)

Andrew Scheer

Scheer VIII (February 1, 2020 – August 23, 2020) 
Scheer made changes to his Shadow Cabinet as a result of various members of his caucus announcing their candidacy for the party's leadership. Under caucus rules, MPs running for party leadership had to resign their critic positions.

Scheer VII (November 29, 2019 – January 31, 2020)

References 

Canadian shadow cabinets
Leaders of the Opposition (Canada)
Government of Canada
Westminster system